The Boteti River (also Botletle River or Botletli) is a natural watercourse in Botswana. It derives flow from the core Okavango Delta through the Thamalakane River in Maun.

Hydrology
In the rainy season, the Boteti discharges to the Makgadikgadi Pans, bringing that area alive with seasonal activity and high biological productivity. In the dry season, the Boteti is particularly important to provide wildlife an area to congregate, since most seasonal ponds and drainages are devoid of water.

The Boteti flows southeastward out of the Thamalakane River swamp at Toteng, then flows northeastward past Tlkaseoulo, over Ghautsa Falls, and then flows east past the villages of Makalamabedi, Muekekle, and Matima, and then at Kwaraga, it turns south past the villages of Phukumakaku, Khumaga (Lekono), Sukwane, Rakops (Jakops), and Xhuma (Khomo). It then flows past Lake Xau (or in a very wet year into and out of Lake Xau) and then heads east past the village of Mopipi (Madista) and into the Ntwetwe Pan.

The Boteti stretches from Ngamiland to the main Boteti District, where it is used to fill the Mopipi Dam, which is important to the many diamond mines of the area, particularly the Orapa diamond mine. The diversion of the river has left many residents without an adequate source of fresh water; moreover, they could no longer enjoy fishing and other activities in the river.

History
In the early and mid-20th century, the lower Boteti, below Sukwane, was a major grain-producing area, with over 2,000 ha under cultivation until 1980. However, the number and extent of wet years has declined, and the river was channelized below Rakops to increase flow to the Mopipi Dam. It flowed year-round before the mid-1990s, after which decreasing flows led to seasonal desiccation in some lower reaches.

See also
 Nxai Pan
 Nata River
 Sua Pan
 Nwetwe Pan

References

Rivers of Botswana